The 147th Massachusetts General Court, consisting of the Massachusetts Senate and the Massachusetts House of Representatives, met in 1931 and 1932.

Senators

Representatives

See also
 1932 Massachusetts gubernatorial election
 72nd United States Congress
 List of Massachusetts General Courts

References

External links
 
 
 
 

Political history of Massachusetts
Massachusetts legislative sessions
massachusetts
1931 in Massachusetts
massachusetts
1932 in Massachusetts